The members of the New South Wales Legislative Assembly who served in the 21st parliament of New South Wales from 1907 to 1910 were elected at the 1907 state election on 10 September 1907. The Speaker was William McCourt.

See also
Wade ministry
Results of the 1907 New South Wales state election
 Candidates of the 1907 New South Wales state election

Notes

References

Members of New South Wales parliaments by term
20th-century Australian politicians